Davis Sanchez (born August 7, 1974) is a former football player who played cornerback in both the Canadian Football League and National Football League. He is the co-founder of the TSN Edge and is an NFL and CFL game analyst at TSN.

Early years
Sanchez attended North Delta Secondary School where he played basketball, but not football. He played one year of college basketball then turned his attention completely to football. A member of the Butte College sports hall of fame he was a 1st team All - American and California JC Defensive Player of the year before signing with the Oregon Ducks. His Oregon career was cut short after a broken leg at the end of that season he entered the CFL Draft and was selected in the 1st round.

Professional football career
Sanchez was selected 6th overall in the 1999 CFL College Draft by the Montreal Alouettes. He had nine interceptions in 2000, topping the CFL. That year, he won the Lew Hayman Trophy as the best Canadian in the East Division. In 2001, he signed with the San Diego Chargers, with whom he played two seasons. He returned to the CFL in 2003 with the Calgary Stampeders. In 2004, he was traded to Montreal. In 2005, he signed with the Edmonton Eskimos. On February 18, 2006, he was traded again to Montreal for Reggie Durden and Rob Brown. This was Sanchez's third spell with the Alouettes, who he played with for four seasons.

In his career, Sanchez has played on three Grey Cup-winning teams. The first was in 2005 with the Edmonton Eskimos, though he was injured and did not play in the Grey Cup Game. He was able to take part in the Montreal Alouettes' 2009 Grey Cup victory, saying afterward, "I'm so excited, there's no words." Sanchez has been named to the East Division All-Star team on three occasions. 

On February 9, 2010, Sanchez signed with his hometown team, the BC Lions, after requesting his release from the Montreal Alouettes. In 2011, he won his third Grey Cup. After two seasons with the Lions, he announced his retirement on May 14, 2012.

Broadcasting career

In May 2017, Sanchez was announced as the new game analyst on TSN 690 for the Alouettes' radio broadcasts. In 2018, Sanchez joined the CFL on TSN panel as a game analyst for TSN's CFL television broadcasts. In 2019, he joined NFL on TSN broadcast and in 2020 started covering the NFL for TSN and CTV on a full-time basis. Along with being a TSN football analyst he is also the co-founder of The TSN Edge which launched in 2020 and is TSN's Sports betting and fantasy hub.

References

1974 births
Living people
American football cornerbacks
BC Lions players
Calgary Stampeders players
Canadian expatriate American football people in the United States
Canadian football defensive backs
Canadian people of Mexican descent
Black Canadian players of American football
Canadian radio sportscasters
Edmonton Elks players
Montreal Alouettes players
Oregon Ducks football players
People from Delta, British Columbia
Players of Canadian football from British Columbia
San Diego Chargers players